Junya Ito may refer to:
Junya Ito (footballer, born 1993) (伊東 純也), Japanese footballer
Junya Ito (footballer, born 1998) (伊藤 純也), Japanese footballer